Bertrand, comte Clauzel (12 December 177221 April 1842) was a French soldier who served in the Revolutionary and Napoleonic wars. He saw service in the Low Countries, Italy and Spain where he would achieve short periods of independent command. He became a Marshal of France under the Orléan monarchy following the July Revolution.

When asked on Saint Helena which of his generals was the most skilful, Napoleon named Clauzel along with Louis-Gabriel Suchet and Étienne Maurice Gérard.

Military career 
Bertrand Clauzel was born on 12 December 1772 at Mirepoix in the County of Foix and served in the first campaign of the French Revolutionary Wars as one of the volunteers of 1791.

In June 1795, having distinguished himself repeatedly on the northern frontier (1792–1793) and the fighting in the eastern Pyrénées (1793–1794), Clauzel was made a general of brigade. In this rank he served in Italy in 1798 and 1799, and in the disastrous campaign of the latter year he won great distinction at Trebbia and at Novi.
 
In 1802 he served in the expedition to San Domingo. He became a general of division in December 1802, and after his return to France he was in almost continuous service there until, in 1806, he was sent to the army of Naples. Soon after this Napoleon made him a grand officer of the Legion of Honor. In 1808–1809, he was with Marmont in Dalmatia, and at the close of 1809 he was appointed to a command in the Army of Portugal under Masséna.

Peninsular campaigns of 1810-12 

Clauzel commanded a division in the Army of Portugal during Peninsular campaigns of 1810-12, including the Torres Vedras campaign and, under Marmont, he did excellent service in re-establishing the discipline, efficiency and mobility of the army, which had suffered severely in the retreat from Torres Vedras. In the 1812 Salamanca campaign, the result of Clauzel's work was shown in the marching powers of the French.

Salamanca - "a grand attempt to retrieve the battle" 
At the Battle of Salamanca, Clauzel's division started the day to the rear of the French left and advanced to shore it up the following the rout of Thomières's division. With Marmont and Bonet wounded, Clauzel was the most senior officer at hand and took command of the French forces. 

He inherited a dangerous situation - Marmont's flank attempt having exposed Thomières's and then Maucune's divisions to Anglo-Portuguese attack. Lewis Butler describes Clauzel's subsequent actions as "a grand attempt to retrieve the battle".

The battlefield was dominated by two small hills, the lesser and the greater Arapiles. The lesser Arapile was at the centre of the Anglo-Portuguese army, while the greater was at the centre of the French army. Both hills acted as lynchpins anchoring each army's lines. Clauzel's strategy was therefore to respond to the attack on his left by an attack on the Anglo-Portuguese centre - taking the lesser Arapile.

His attack failed, repulsed by fresh troops, leaving the Army of Portugal disordered and vulnerable to further attacks on its left and centre, concluding the battle as a sound French defeat. Butler writes that the fighting had reduced the divisions of Maucune, Thomières and Clauzel to a state where they "no longer existed as a military body".

The Castile Campaign  
The retreat from Salamanca with a broken army was difficult. Initially it was covered by Foy's division, the only French formation not to suffer heavily, made up the rear guard but it was defeated decisively at the Battle of García Hernández.

Clauzel extricated what forces of the Army of Portugal he could retreating North of Burgos which Wellington besieged before he attempted to rebuild the Army of Portugal to lift the siege. Reinforced by General Souham Clauzel returned to division command in the subsequent campaign which saw Wellington driven back to his starting position in Badajoz. However, while Wellington had returned to his starting position the significance of the campaign and Clauzels costly loss at Salamanca is that it forced French forces in Spain to concentrate against Wellington leading to the liberation by Spanish forces of the provinces of Andalusia, Extremadura, and Asturias.

Army Command in Spain and during Hundred Days 

Early in 1813 Clauzel was made commander of the Army of the North in Spain, but he was a days march away and thus unable to come to the aid of Jourdan and avert the great disaster of Vitoria. Under the supreme command of Soult he served through the rest of the Peninsular War with unvarying distinction. On the first restoration in 1814 he submitted unwillingly to the Bourbons, and when Napoleon returned to France, he hastened to join him. During the Hundred Days he was in command of an army defending the Pyrenean frontier. Even after Waterloo he long refused to recognize the restored government, and he escaped to America, being condemned to death in absence. He then settled in the Vine and Olive Colony in Alabama, later returning to France after the failure of that venture.

Political life 

He took the first opportunity of returning to aid the Orléanist Liberals in France (1820), sat in the Chamber of deputies from 1827 to 1830, and after the July Revolution of 1830 was at once given a military command. Clauzel replaced the Legitimist General Louis-Auguste-Victor de Bourmont as head of the invasion of Algeria. He made a successful campaign, but he was soon recalled by the home government, which desired to avoid complications in Algeria. At the same time he was made a Marshal of France (February 1831). For some four years thereafter he urged his Algerian policy upon the Chamber of Deputies, and finally in 1835 was reappointed commander-in-chief. But after several victories, including the taking of Mascara in 1835, the Marshal met with a severe setback at Constantine in 1836.

A change of government in France was primarily responsible for the failure, but public opinion attributed it to Clauzel, who was recalled in February 1837. He thereupon retired from active service, and, after vigorously defending his conduct before the deputies, he ceased to take part in public affairs. He lived in complete retirement up to his death at château du Secourieu (Haute-Garonne).

References

1772 births
1842 deaths
People from Ariège (department)
Counts of France
Politicians from Occitania (administrative region)
Orléanists
Members of the Chamber of Deputies of the Bourbon Restoration
Members of the 1st Chamber of Deputies of the July Monarchy
Members of the 2nd Chamber of Deputies of the July Monarchy
Members of the 3rd Chamber of Deputies of the July Monarchy
Members of the 4th Chamber of Deputies of the July Monarchy
Members of the 5th Chamber of Deputies of the July Monarchy
Governors general of Algeria
Marshals of France
Military leaders of the French Revolutionary Wars
French commanders of the Napoleonic Wars
Names inscribed under the Arc de Triomphe